Danielle Ponter (born 8 January  2000) is an Australian rules footballer playing for Adelaide Football Club in the AFL Women's (AFLW). She played for St Mary's and Essendon in her junior career, typically as a forward. Ponter was selected with pick 48 in the 2018 AFL Women's draft and made her debut in round 2 of the 2019 season. She was nominated for the 2019 AFL Women's Rising Star award in round 4.

Early life 
Ponter was born in Darwin, Northern Territory. She had a strong footballing background as part of the noted Rioli–Long family; she is the niece of former Essendon player Michael Long and the cousin of former Hawthorn footballer Cyril Rioli. Ponter began playing for St Mary's at 11 in the under-16 female division of Northern Territory Football League (NTFL), in the 2011–12 season. She won the Sharyn Smith Medal, the division best and fairest, in four consecutive seasons.

Ponter competed at the 2014 AFL Women's Under 18 Championships for the Thunder Devils (a combined Northern Territory–Tasmania team) at 14. She competed at the next three championships and additionally played for the Central Allies in a state of origin match in 2017 and 2018. Ponter attended the 2018 AFLW draft combine and was a member of the 2018 AFLW Academy, one of twenty-nine seventeen-year-old prospects. She played for Essendon's VFL Women's side in 2018, kicking six goals in six matches. Ahead of the 2018 AFLW draft, prospects nominated a state or region they wished to play in; Ponter chose South Australia, meaning Adelaide, as the only South Australian club, was the only team with an opportunity to select her.

AFLW career 
Ponter was drafted by Adelaide with pick 48 in the 2018 AFLW draft, their fifth selection. She continued to play in the NTFL prior to the 2019 AFL Women's season. She was not selected for the opening round of the 2019 season; coach Matthew Clarke acknowledged she was "pretty stiff to miss out". Ponter made her debut the next round, playing as a defender in contrast to her usual position of forward in her junior career. This made her the first member of the Rioli–Long family to play top-level women's Australian rules football. She returned to the forward line in round 4 and received a nomination for the 2019 AFL Women's Rising Star award after kicking two goals.

References

External links 

Living people
2000 births
Australian rules footballers from the Northern Territory
Sportspeople from Darwin, Northern Territory
St Mary's Football Club (NTFL) players
Adelaide Football Club (AFLW) players
Rioli family
Indigenous Australian players of Australian rules football